An Associate of Science in Respiratory Care (ASRC) is an entry-level tertiary education respiratory therapy degree.  In the United States, this type of degree is usually awarded by community colleges or similar respiratory schools. Some four year colleges also offer this degree.   Students in the United States awarded an Associate of Science in Respiratory Care are qualified to sit for the NBRC-ELE and then the NBRC-WRE and NBRC-CSE then apply for state licensure as a Registered Respiratory Therapist.

Respiratory care practice 
Students awarded an Associate of Science in Respiratory Care are qualified to sit for the three credentialing examinations NBRC-ELE, NBRC-WRE, and NBRC-CSE and apply for licensure as a Registered Respiratory Therapist.

Similar degrees 
Associate of Respiratory Therapy (ART)
Associate of Applied Science in Respiratory Therapy (AAS)
Associate of Science in Advanced Respiratory Therapy (ASART)
Associate Degree in Respiratory Therapy (ADRT)
Associate of Science in Cardiopulmonary Sciences (ASCS)

References

Science in Respiratory Care
Respiratory therapy
Respiratory Care